Alex O'Neill, better known under the stage name Ayokay, is an American producer and DJ from Grosse Pointe, Michigan.

O'Neill attended high school with Mike Temrowski, who went on to become Quinn XCII; the pair worked together while both were college students at different universities in Michigan. Their 2016 single "Kings of Summer" was chosen by Ian Desmond, then a baseball player for the Texas Rangers, as his walk-up music, which increased the track's popularity and led to a record deal with Columbia. O'Neill then moved to Los Angeles, releasing a full-length album, In the Shape of a Dream, which featured various artists including Jeremy Zucker, Quinn XCII, Nightly, Jenny Mayhem, Future Jr., and Katie Pearlman in 2018. He has had two hit singles on the Billboard Hot Dance/Electronic Songs Chart: "Kings of Summer" with Quinn XCII, which reached #18 in 2016, and "The Shine" with Chelsea Cutler, which reached #50 in 2017.
He released the album Digital Dreamscape in 2022.

Discography

References

Living people
Musicians from Michigan
American electronic musicians
Record producers from Michigan
People from Grosse Pointe, Michigan
Year of birth missing (living people)